The Men's marathon B1 was a marathon event in athletics at the 1992 Summer Paralympics, for totally blind athletes. It was contested by seven athletes from six countries. Among them was defending champion Joerund Gaasemyr, of Norway, who had won the race in 1988 with a world record time of 2:45:48. Also competing was his compatriot Tofiri Kibuuka, who had previously represented his native Uganda at the Winter Paralympics, and had been the first African athlete at the Winter Games.

Results

See also
 Marathon at the Paralympics

References 

Men's marathon B1
1992 marathons
Marathons at the Paralympics
Men's marathons